Slobodan Nikolić (born 27 March 1957) is a Serbian politician and the current president of the  Russian Party, which advocates for the interests of the Russian minority in Serbia, as well as for the closer cooperation with the Russian Federation. Nikolić is a former vice president of the People's Peasant Party.

Biography 
He was born on 27 March 1957 in Šabac. From 1983 to 1984, he worked in the National Statistical Office, and from 1984 to 1996, he worked as a commercialist in the MPI "Žitoratar" Šabac. From 1996 to 2001 he had his own private business. From 2001 to 2005, he was a Director of the Association "Village Threshold 98". The association deals with the revitalization and demographic problems of the villages, and the establishment of cooperation with the Russian Federation. In 1998, official cooperation was established with the Ivanovo region in Russia and a protocol on cooperation with the Cultural Fund was signed. From 2005 to 2006 he was the director of "Zorka plant protection" and from 2006 to 2015 he was a  member of the City Council of Šabac in charge of cooperation with citizens' associations and cooperation with the Russian Federation. Since 2010, he has been the president of the Serbian-Russian Friendship Association "Vladimir Putin" in Šabac and continues the already well-established cooperation with the Russian Federation.

On December 26, 2011, the city of Šabac received the Order of "Yermak" from the Presidium of the Council for Social Recognitions of the Russian Federation, and he received the Order of Tsar Nikolai II Romanov. He also won the Medal of the City of Moscow in 2011.

He served as the vice president of the People's Peasant Party until 2013, when he founded the Russian Party with the goal of establishing even closer connections of Serbia and the Russian Federation. The party advocates Serbia's entry into the Eurasian Economic Union, and the full membership of Serbia in the Collective Security Treaty Organization. The party also advocates increasing cooperation with the Russian Federation in the field of economy, culture and education.

Personal life 
He is married and is a father of three children. Besides his native Serbian, he speaks Russian.

References 

1957 births
Living people
Politicians from Šabac
Serbian eurosceptics